Dizaj-e Aland (also Romanized as Dīzaj-e Aland; also known as Aland) is a village in Aland Rural District of Safayyeh District of Khoy County, West Azerbaijan province, Iran. At the 2006 National Census, its population was 1,038 in 171 households. The following census in 2011 counted 1,132 people in 235 households. The latest census in 2016 showed a population of 1,249 people in 277 households; it was the largest village in its rural district.

References 

Khoy County

Populated places in West Azerbaijan Province

Populated places in Khoy County